Xalpatlahuac is one of the 81 municipalities of Guerrero, in south-western Mexico. The municipal seat lies at Xalpatlahuac.  The municipality covers an area of 393.6 km².

In 2005, the municipality had a total population of 12,615.

References

Municipalities of Guerrero